Jessica Anne Krug (born ) is an American historian, author, and activist who taught at George Washington University (GWU) from 2012 to 2020, eventually becoming a tenured associate professor of history. Her publications include Fugitive Modernities: Kisama and the Politics of Freedom, which was a finalist for the Frederick Douglass Prize and the Harriet Tubman Prize. Krug received media scrutiny in September 2020 following her admission that she had misrepresented her race and ethnicity during her career. Shortly after her misrepresentations were revealed, Krug resigned her position at GWU.

Biography
She graduated from the elite Barstow School, a co-ed private college prep school in south Kansas City. She later attended the University of Kansas without claiming to be a person of color before transferring to Portland State University, where she earned a bachelor's degree. In 2012, Krug earned a Ph.D. from the University of Wisconsin–Madison, "one of the nation's most prestigious African-history programs". Her doctoral adviser there was James Sweet; eventually, when Krug extended her thesis and published it as a book, she did not acknowledge Sweet.

Krug has stated that she suffers from unaddressed mental health issues, and that she began to pass as a light-skinned person of color as a juvenile to escape from trauma and emotional difficulties.

Career 
Krug taught university classes in the Washington D.C. area, and lived in East Harlem in New York City. Krug began teaching history at George Washington University (GWU) in 2012. She gained tenure in 2018. As of 2020, she was an associate professor. Krug has authored articles and a book relating to African American history and Latin America. She has published essays in Essence and at the race-exploring website RaceBaitR. Krug received financial support from the Schomburg Center for Research in Black Culture that led to the publication of her book Fugitive Modernities. In 2009, she was awarded a $45,000 Fulbright-Hays Doctoral Dissertation Research Abroad Fellowship.

Fugitive Modernities 
Krug is the author of Fugitive Modernities: Kisama and the Politics of Freedom, a book about the Quiçama people in Angola and within diaspora, especially in Brazil. The book was a finalist for the Frederick Douglass Prize and the Harriet Tubman Prize. In Fugitive Modernities, Krug engages in a "rigorous examination of identity formation" of Kisama, a mountainous region in Angola that became a destination for those fleeing the slave trade in the late 16th century. Krug's book was the first history of the Kisama region. She argued that "Kisama allows us to imagine a more humane and less brutalized form of interpersonal relationship in which the structures erected by states to constrain us are overcome in favor of shared liberation."

Racial identity controversy 
Krug has made up various lies concerning her race and ethnicity. She has said that she is half Algerian-American and half German-American. She has also said that she is a Bronx-bred Afro-"boricua" (Afro–Puerto Rican) and has used the name "Jess La Bombalera". A junior scholar noticed that Krug's stated race/ethnicity had changed from part-Algerian–part-German to Afro–Puerto Rican. Word of this discrepancy reached Professor Yomaira C. Figueroa-Vásquez of Michigan State University, who, upon researching the matter, discovered that Krug came from the Kansas City area and had Jewish parents.

In a September 3, 2020 blog post, Krug said: "I have eschewed my lived experience as a white Jewish child in suburban Kansas City under various assumed identities within a Blackness that I had no right to claim: first North African Blackness, then US rooted Blackness, then Caribbean rooted Bronx Blackness." Krug's disclosure drew international media attention. Her September 3 blog post went viral. By the close of that day, "a now-infamous video of Krug calling herself 'Jess La Bombalera' and speaking in a D-list imitation Bronx accent was all over the internet".

Hari Ziyad, the editor of RaceBaitr, said Krug had only come forward with the revelation of her racial deceptions because they had been discovered and were about to be made public against her wishes. Similarly, Figueroa-Vásquez asserted that pending public revelations of Krug's true racial identity prompted her confession. Figueroa, believing that Krug "took up some of the very few — very few — resources and spaces that there are available to Black and Latino scholars and use those to her advantage," called for "a form of restitution for the things that she [Krug] took. It's egregious." Figueroa and Hunter College's Yarimar Bonilla called Krug's various cultural appropriations a form of minstrelsy. Figueroa also noted that Krug had falsely claimed that her parents had been drug addicts and her mother a sex worker; Figueroa described Krug's actions as "preying on the white imagination, [pulling] from some of the worst stereotypes that there are about black people and Puerto Rican people, and using that as a cloak for her identity". Describing Krug as a "minstrel act", Illinois State University's Touré F. Reed asserted that Krug did not appropriate legitimate black culture but rather its "racist caricature". 

Duke University Press, the publisher of Krug's Fugitive Modernities, said that all proceeds from her book will be donated to a fund that will assist Black and Latinx scholars.

Resignation
Following Krug's disclosure of her misrepresentation, George Washington University's history department asked her to resign her tenured professorship, stating: "With her conduct, Dr. Krug has raised questions about the veracity of her own research and teaching". GWU cancelled her classes after the scandal. Krug had told her colleagues at GWU that she was Afro-Latina, and that she had been raised in the Bronx by a Puerto Rican mother who was abusive and addicted to drugs. In her classes, she occasionally used Spanglish and spoke of her Puerto Rican heritage. On September 9, 2020, GWU confirmed that Krug had resigned from the university.

See also 
 Rachel Dolezal
 H. G. Carrillo

References

1980s births
American people of German-Jewish descent
21st-century American essayists
21st-century American women writers
Activists for African-American civil rights
Activists from Kansas
African American–Jewish relations
American women memoirists
21st-century American memoirists
Dance teachers
George Washington University faculty
Jewish American activists
Jewish women writers
Living people
People from Overland Park, Kansas
Portland State University alumni
Pseudonymous women writers
University of Kansas alumni
University of Wisconsin–Madison alumni
Place of birth missing (living people)
21st-century pseudonymous writers